Ryan P. Ruocco (born November 18, 1986) is an American television and radio sportscaster. He serves as a play-by-play announcer for the NBA and WNBA on ESPN, the New York Yankees and Brooklyn Nets on YES Network, and boxing for DAZN. He hosts the podcast R2C2 with former Yankees all-star pitcher CC Sabathia on The Ringer's podcast network. He previously hosted the Stephen A. Smith & Ryan Ruocco Show on ESPN Radio 98.7 FM.

Biography
Ruocco is the secondary play-by-play television announcer for the Brooklyn Nets and New York Yankees. He joined the Nets broadcast team in 2011. He also does select college basketball games for YES and was the host of This Week in Football for the YES Network that focused on the New York Giants and Jets. His analysts were Howard Cross, Gary Myers, and Ross Tucker. He joined the network in 2007 as the New York Yankees statistician.

Ruocco saw his first action as a lead play-by-play man for the YES Network when he called a series between the New York Yankees and Houston Astros in June 2015.

During the 2019 baseball season, Ruocco stepped up as the main voice of the New York Yankees on the YES Network. In addition to Ruocco’s regular slate of Yankees broadcasts, he took over for YES Network’s play-by-play broadcaster Michael Kay as he underwent vocal cord surgery. Ruocco also filled in for the legendary radio sportscaster John Sterling on WFAN, who took off his first radio broadcast after working 5,060 straight Yankees games since 1989.

Ruocco also works for ESPN and ESPN New York 98.7 FM. He has appeared as a contributor on The Michael Kay Show and as a substitute host on various ESPN Radio shows. He was a fill-in host prior to 2008 for ESPN Radio and anchored ESPN Radio SportsCenter and was a correspondent for the NFL Network. He also called college football and basketball games for ESPN Radio and also does play-by-play duties for The NFL on ESPN Radio beginning in 2013 with three other play-by-play men Marc Kestecher, Sean McDonough, and Bill Rosinski.

Ruocco also does the television play-by-play broadcast for NBA on ESPN games as well as WNBA on ESPN. Ruocco is the lead play-by-play broadcaster for the WNBA. In 2020, Ruocco was the first play-by-play announcer to use the correct pronouns for New York Liberty star Layshia Clarendon, who is non-binary, when describing Clarendon’s baskets and rebounds, compelling a progressive and inclusive shift for gender norms in sports.

Ruocco co-hosts the podcast R2C2 alongside former New York Yankees all-star pitcher CC Sabathia on The Ringer's podcast network, which is a part of Spotify. Sabathia and Ruocco welcome athlete and celebrity guests for wide-ranging conversations.

As a student at Fordham University, he called Rams football and basketball on WFUV.

In 2019, Ruocco came in seventh on American news blog The Big Lead’s “40 Under 40: Sports Media Talents”, alongside CBS’s Tony Romo and Fox Sports’s Joe Davis. The Big Lead states: “What a resume Ryan Ruocco is going to have when all is said and done. Ruocco has now added DAZN boxing to his arsenal and is far from being done. He captures big moments like Mike Breen and should be in the running to one day replacing him in calling the NBA Finals. That goes along with being the presumed future voice of the New York Yankees.”

Personal
Ruocco is a native of Fishkill, New York.
He is a graduate of Hackley School in Tarrytown, New York and Fordham University. Ruocco became engaged to private equity executive Andrea Ferzoco in January 2019. They were married in a private ceremony in November 2020, and Andrea gave birth to a daughter named Everly in September 2021.

Awards
Marty Glickman Award 2008
Fish for Breakfast Nominee 2014
New York Emmy Award, Best Live Sports Series (Brooklyn Nets) 2014 
New York Emmy Award, Sport Event/Game - Live/Unedited (New York Yankees) 2017 
New York Emmy Award Nominee 2017, Talent: Sports Play-by-Play
New York Emmy Award Nominee 2018, Talent: Sports Play-by-Play
New York Emmy Award Nominee 2019, Talent: Sports Play-by-Play
New York Emmy Award, Best Live Sports Series (Brooklyn Nets) 2019 
New York Emmy Award Nominee 2021, Talent: Sports Play-by-Play

References

External links

1986 births
Living people
American people of Italian descent
American radio sports announcers
American talk radio hosts
American television sports announcers
Brooklyn Nets announcers
College basketball announcers in the United States
College football announcers
Fordham University alumni
Fordham Rams football announcers
Major League Baseball broadcasters
National Basketball Association broadcasters
National Football League announcers
New York Yankees announcers
People from Fishkill, New York
Women's National Basketball Association announcers
YES Network
American podcasters
Hackley School alumni
WFUV people